Jaunā pasaule (the New World) is neighborhood of Liepāja, Latvia. Located near the east border of the city.

References 

Neighbourhoods in Liepāja